Francesco Brunery (1849–1926), also known as François Brunery and as François Bruneri, was an Italian academic painter.  He was born in Turin, Italy and studied with Jean-Léon Gérôme and Léon Bonnat.  Brunery received an honorable mention at the Paris Salon of 1903.  He is associated with anti-clerical art.

References

 Thieme, Ulrich and Felix Becker, Allgemeines Lexikon der bildenden Künstler von der Antike bis zur Gegenwart, Leipzig, Veb E.A. Seemann Verlag, 1980–1986.

19th-century Italian painters
Italian male painters
20th-century Italian painters
Anti-clerical art
1849 births
1926 deaths
19th-century Italian male artists
20th-century Italian male artists